Lourdes Hartkopf (born 10 January 1996) is an Argentine sailor. She competed in the women's 470 event at the 2020 Summer Olympics.

References

External links
 

1996 births
Living people
Argentine female sailors (sport)
Olympic sailors of Argentina
Sailors at the 2020 Summer Olympics – 470
People from Posadas, Misiones
Sportspeople from Misiones Province